These are the results of the Women's coxless pair competition, one of six events for female competitors in Rowing at the 2004 Summer Olympics in Athens.

Women's Pair

Heats
10 boats competed in two heats on 14 August, 2004. The top 3 pairs from each heat advanced to the final.

Heat 1

Heat 2

Final

The Romanians never looked likely to lose as they led throughout. At 1,000 metres they were nearly two seconds clear of the Canadians who were half a second ahead of Belarus with world champions Great Britain a further second back. By 1,500 m. they had extended their lead with no change in positions in the trailing pack. Just after this mark Belarus and Great Britain both made a move to push past Canada who could not respond. The British kept their push going and passed the Belarusians and by the finishing line had just about overlapped the dominant Romanians. Belarus were two thirds of length back with a very tired looking Canada a further one and a half lengths away.

References

External links
http://www.la84foundation.org/6oic/OfficialReports/2004/or2004b.pdf

Women's Coxless Pair
Women's Coxless Pair
Women's events at the 2004 Summer Olympics